Jeffrey Edward Anthony Dudgeon MBE is a Northern Irish politician, historian and gay political activist. He previously sat as an Ulster Unionist Party councillor for the Balmoral area of Belfast City Council from 2014 to 2019.

He is best known for bringing the case Dudgeon v United Kingdom to the European Court of Human Rights; this successfully challenged Northern Ireland's laws criminalising consensual sexual acts between men in private. During the 2014–19 council term he was one of three openly gay politicians elected to the City Council, along with Mary Ellen Campbell of Sinn Féin and Julie-Anne Corr of the Progressive Unionist Party; at the 2019 local government election all three lost their seats. He has also published a study of Roger Casement's Black Diaries, which accepted them as genuine.

At the 1979 general election he stood as a "Labour Integrationist" candidate for Belfast South.

Personal life
He is originally from east Belfast, and attended Campbell College then Magee University College and Trinity College, Dublin. He has a long-term partner.

Honours
As part of the 2012 New Year Honours, Dudgeon was appointed a Member of the Order of the British Empire (MBE) for "services to the Lesbian, Gay, Bisexual and Transgender community in Northern Ireland".

References

External links 
 Article on MBE award
 Roger Casement: The Black Diaries - with a study of his background, sexuality, and Irish political life (Second Edition)
 

Living people
Politicians from Belfast
Members of the Order of the British Empire
Gay politicians
LGBT politicians from Northern Ireland
Ulster Unionist Party politicians
LGBT rights activists from Northern Ireland
Year of birth missing (living people)